Starr Peninsula is an ice-covered peninsula about 10 nautical miles (18 km) long, between Wagoner and Potaka Inlets on the north side of Thurston Island. It was delineated from aerial photographs taken by U.S. Navy Operation Highjump in December 1946. It was named by the Advisory Committee on Antarctic Names for Robert B. Starr, oceanographer aboard the USS Glacier in this area during the U.S. Navy Bellingshausen Sea Expedition in February 1960.

Maps
 Thurston Island – Jones Mountains. 1:500000 Antarctica Sketch Map. US Geological Survey, 1967.
 Antarctic Digital Database (ADD). Scale 1:250000 topographic map of Antarctica. Scientific Committee on Antarctic Research (SCAR), 1993–2016.

Peninsulas of Ellsworth Land